NukeWar is a 1980 video game by Avalon Hill for the Apple II, Atari 8-bit family, Commodore 64, Commodore PET, FM-7, TRS-80, and VIC-20.

Gameplay
NukeWar is a game of global thermonuclear war represented by text and sprites on the screen.

Reception
In 1996, Computer Gaming World declared NukeWar the 135th-best computer game ever released.

References

External links
Review in 80 Micro
Review in The Addison Wesley Book Of Atari Software 1984
Review in Ahoy!
Review in Creative Computing

1980 video games
Apple II games
Avalon Hill video games
Atari 8-bit family games
Cold War video games
Commodore 64 games
Commodore PET games
Computer wargames
FM-7 games
TRS-80 games
VIC-20 games
Video games developed in the United States